Mutton Island is an uninhabited island in the Atlantic Ocean, off the coast of County Clare, Ireland, about  from the mainland.

It is used mainly for grazing sheep, and is host to several abandoned houses and two forts.

There is no public ferry service to the island, on which there is no jetty or boat slipway. It contains no roofed buildings, but there is a limited supply of fresh water.

History
The island was populated as late as the 1920s and is believed to have been part of the mainland until the year 804.

References

Islands of County Clare
Uninhabited islands of Ireland